Palais de Sports Jean Weille is an indoor sporting arena located in Nancy, France.  The seating capacity of the arena is 6,027 people.  It is currently home to the SLUC Nancy professional basketball team.

Indoor arenas in France
Buildings and structures in Nancy, France
Basketball venues in France
Sports venues in Meurthe-et-Moselle